is a Japanese football player, who plays for SC Sagamihara as a midfielder.

Career
After graduating from Kanagawa University, he was chosen and signed by Fukushima United FC in January 2015.

He is the twin brother of Yuji Hoshi, who currently plays for Albirex Niigata.

Club statistics
Updated to 23 February 2020.

References

External links
Profile at Fukushima United FC

1992 births
Living people
Kanagawa University alumni
Association football people from Kanagawa Prefecture
Japanese footballers
J3 League players
Fukushima United FC players
SC Sagamihara players
Association football midfielders